Nordwestliche Insel Mountains is a small, detached group of mountains, island-like in appearance, and forming the northern extremity of the Humboldt Mountains, in the Wohlthat Mountains of Queen Maud Land. Discovered by the German Antarctic Expedition under Ritscher, 1938–39, and named Nordwestliche Insel (northwest island). The feature lies at the northwest extremity of the Wohlthat Mountains.

Mountain ranges of Queen Maud Land
Humboldt Mountains (Antarctica)